The Disintegration Loops is a series of four albums by the American avant-garde composer William Basinski, released in 2002 and 2003. The albums comprise tape loop recordings played for extended time, with noise and cracks increasing as the tape deteriorated. Basinski discovered the effect while attempting to transfer his earlier recordings to digital format.

The completion of the recording coincided with the 9/11 attacks, which Basinski witnessed from his rooftop in Brooklyn; the artwork features Basinski's footage of the New York City skyline in the aftermath of the World Trade Center's collapse. He dedicated the music to the victims of the attacks.

The Disintegration Loops gathered critical acclaim. It was initially released in four parts, and was reissued in 2012 on its tenth anniversary as a nine-LP box set. Two orchestral renditions have also been performed, and were included in the reissue.

Recording
In the 1980s, Basinski recorded from found sound sources, shortwave radio and delay systems, influenced by musicians such as Steve Reich and Brian Eno. Decades later, while transferring the recordings from magnetic tape to digital format, Basinski found that the tape had deteriorated; as it passed the tape head, the ferrite detached from the plastic backing. He allowed the loops to play for extended periods as they deteriorated further, with increasing gaps and cracks in the music. He further treated the sounds with a spatializing reverb effect.

Basinski finished the project the morning of the September 11, 2001 attacks in New York City, and sat on the roof of his apartment building in Brooklyn with friends as the World Trade Center collapsed. He filmed the fallout during the last hour of daylight from a roof, and the following morning he played "Disintegration Loop 1.1" as a soundtrack to the aftermath. Stills from the video were used as the covers for the set of four CDs, and several weeks later Basinski dedicated the work to the victims in a postscript in the liner notes. He said that "the events gave new meaning to the musical pieces created by catastrophic decay in my studio a few weeks before".

On September 11, 2011, Basinski's work was performed at the Metropolitan Museum of Art in New York City as a live orchestration to mark the tenth anniversary of the terrorist attacks.

Reception

Pitchfork named The Disintegration Loops I–IV the 30th-best album of 2004 and the 196th-best album of the 2000s. In 2016, Pitchfork named it the third-best ambient record of all time. It was named the 86th best album of the decade by Resident Advisor, and the 10th best by Tiny Mix Tapes.

2012 reissue
On September 4, 2012, New York-based record label Temporary Residence reissued the entire Disintegration Loops as a nine-LP box set, marking the project's 10-year anniversary and its impending induction into the National September 11 Memorial & Museum. The collection, which was remastered, was released in a limited edition of 2,000 copies, with a 5xCD version, 63-minute DVD, and 144-page coffee table book with photos and liner notes by Basinski, Antony, David Tibet, Ronen Givony and Michael Shulan.

Track listing

See also
List of ambient music artists
Minimalist music
Magnetic tape
Everywhere at the End of Time, often compared to The Disintegration Loops

References

Further reading

External links
 
 
 
 
 AllMusic
 Amazon.com
NPR article about the album

2002 albums
William Basinski albums
Music about the September 11 attacks
Experimental music albums by American artists
2002 compositions
Ambient albums
2003 compositions
2003 albums